An election to the Shetland Islands Council was held on 3 May 1990 as part of regional elections. Independents maintained control of the 25 seat council. The Shetland Movement gained two seats, bringing their total to seven. The Scottish National Party and Liberal Democrats also ran candidates for the first time.

Aggregate results

Ward Results

By-elections since 1990

Notes

References

1990
1990 Scottish local elections